PJP may refer to:

People's Justice Party (UK), a former political party
Plastic Jet Printing, see Fused deposition modeling. 
Pneumocystis jiroveci pneumonia, an opportunistic infection mainly affecting HIV positive persons
.pjp, a file extension for JPEG